Hanceola is a genus of flowering plants in the mint family, Lamiaceae, first described with this name in 1929. The entire genus is endemic to China.

Species
Hanceola cavaleriei (H.Lév.) Kudô - Guizhou
Hanceola cordivata Y.Z.Sun - Guizhou, Sichuan
Hanceola exserta Y.Z.Sun ex C.Y.Wu - Fujian, Guangdong, Hunan, Jiangxi, Zhejiang
Hanceola flexuosa C.Y.Wu & H.W.Li - Guangxi
Hanceola labordei (H.Lév.) Y.Z.Sun - Guizhou
Hanceola mairei (H.Lév.) Y.Z.Sun - Yunnan
Hanceola sinensis (Hemsl.) Kudô - Guangxi, Guizhou, Hunan, Sichuan, Yunnan
Hanceola tuberifera Y.Z.Sun ex G.Y.Wu - Sichuan

References

Lamiaceae
Lamiaceae genera
Endemic flora of China